José Tito Hernández Jaramillo (born 8 May 1994) is a Colombian road cyclist, who currently rides for UCI Continental team .

Major results

2012
 1st  Road race, National Junior Road Championships
2015
 2nd Coppa della Pace
2018
 1st Stage 3 Clásico RCN
2019
 1st 
2020
 1st Overall Clásico RCN
1st Stage 1 (TTT)
 1st Gran Premio de la Patagonia
 1st Stage 8 Vuelta a Colombia
2021
 1st  Overall Vuelta a Colombia

References

External links

1994 births
Living people
Colombian male cyclists
Vuelta a Colombia stage winners
Sportspeople from Antioquia Department
20th-century Colombian people
21st-century Colombian people